The Parukotoan languages are a subgroup of the Cariban language family. The languages are spoken in Brazil, Suriname, and Guyana.

Languages
The Parukotoan languages are:

Waiwai
Sikiana, Hixkaryana

References

Cariban languages